Mattias Daniel Eliasson (born 2 April 1975) is a Swedish professional golfer.

Career
Eliasson turned professional in 1997. He played on the second-tier Challenge Tour from 1998 to 2004, with three runners-up finishes, in 1998, 1999, and 2004. During this period he also was successful at qualifying school on three occasions, allowing him to play limited events on the main European Tour in 2000, 2002, and 2003.

In 2004 Eliasson finished in eleventh place on the Challenge Tour rankings, which gave him full promotion to the European Tour. He went on to play at that level for three seasons, from 2005 to 2007.

He then suffered a slump in form, however, and has played only sporadically on either tour since 2008. Nonetheless, he has recorded three wins on the third-tier Nordic League in that time.

Eliasson's best result on the European Tour was a third place in the 2006 Open de España. 2006 was also his best season at the highest level, as he finished 75th in the Order of Merit, with five top-ten finishes in his first seven tournaments.

Professional wins (3)

Nordic Golf League wins (3)

Playoff record
Challenge Tour playoff record (0–1)

Results in major championships

Note: Eliasson only played in The Open Championship.

CUT = missed the half-way cut

Team appearances
Amateur
European Amateur Team Championship (representing Sweden): 1995, 1997
European Youths' Team Championship (representing Sweden): 1996

See also
2005 European Tour Qualifying School graduates

References

External links

Swedish male golfers
European Tour golfers
Sportspeople from Västra Götaland County
People from Borås
1975 births
Living people